Parret is a village in the former Commune of Baldushk, Tirana County, western Albania. At the 2015 local government reform it became part of the municipality Tirana.

References

Populated places in Tirana
Villages in Tirana County